Wang Beixing (born 10 March 1985) is a Chinese long track speed skater, specializing in short distances (500 m and 1000 m).

Wang first competed in 2003. However, her breakthrough came in the 2004–05 season, winning several times in the World Cup B-group and competing in the A-group. At the World Single Distance Championships she surprisingly won silver. She appeared to be a medal candidate at the 2006 Winter Olympics in Turin. However, here she disappointed with a 7th place at the 500 m and a 29th at the 1000 m.

In January 2009, she won the World Sprint Championships, the first Chinese woman to do so since Ye Qiaobo in 1993. She won the bronze medal in the 500 m sprint at the 2010 Vancouver Winter Olympics.

She was formerly coached by retired Canadian Olympic medallist and former world record holder Kevin Overland.

Personal records

References

External links
Wang Beixing at SkateResults.com
Personal records of Wang Beixing at Jakub Majerski's Speedskating Database

1985 births
Speed skaters at the 2006 Winter Olympics
Speed skaters at the 2010 Winter Olympics
Speed skaters at the 2014 Winter Olympics
Olympic speed skaters of China
Medalists at the 2010 Winter Olympics
Olympic medalists in speed skating
Olympic bronze medalists for China
Chinese female speed skaters
Sportspeople from Harbin
Living people
Asian Games medalists in speed skating
Speed skaters at the 2003 Asian Winter Games
Speed skaters at the 2007 Asian Winter Games
Speed skaters at the 2011 Asian Winter Games
Asian Games gold medalists for China
Asian Games silver medalists for China
Medalists at the 2007 Asian Winter Games
Medalists at the 2011 Asian Winter Games
World Single Distances Speed Skating Championships medalists
World Sprint Speed Skating Championships medalists
20th-century Chinese women
21st-century Chinese women